Pāpaaloa (also spelled Papaaloa) is an unincorporated community on the island of Hawaii in Hawaii County, Hawaii, United States.  It lies along Hawaii Route 19 north of Hilo, the county seat of Hawaii County.  Its elevation is  about 300 feet above sea level (about 90 m)  Because the community has borne multiple names, the Board on Geographic Names officially designated it "Papaaloa" in 1914 and 1954 before assigning the current name in 2001.  It has a post office with the ZIP code 96780.

References

Unincorporated communities in Hawaii County, Hawaii
Populated places on Hawaii (island)
Unincorporated communities in Hawaii